is a Japanese voice actress and singer from Higashiōsaka, Osaka, Japan.

Film 
 Topo Gigio (1988), Gina
 Yume Miru Topo Gigio (1988), Gina
 Saint Seiya: Kamigami No Atsuki Tatakai (1988), Freyja

Music 
Pink, Pink, PINK - Dokincho! Nemurin
Yoake no Yumeoibtio - Silver Fang
Cosmos Adventure - Ultraman Kids: 30 Million Light Years Looking for Mama
Twinkle Twinkle Wink ~Onegai Shooting Star~ - Ultraman Kids: 30 Million Light Years Looking for Mama
Fancy Girl - The Wonderful Wizard of Oz

References

External links 
 Satoko Yamano at GamePlaza-Haruka Voice Acting Database 
 

1963 births
Living people
Voice actresses from Osaka Prefecture
Japanese women singers
Japanese video game actresses
Japanese voice actresses
Musicians from Osaka Prefecture
Anime singers